JRJR, JR JR or Jr. Jr. may refer to:

 John Romita Jr. (born 1956), U.S. comic book artist nicknamed "JRJR"
 JR JR, U.S. indie-pop band formerly named "Dale Earnhardt Jr. Jr."
 JR Cigars (stock ticker: JRJR) U.S. cigar wholesaler and retailer

Postnominal Jr. Jr.
 Hendrik Toompere Jr. Jr. (born 1986; Hendrik Toompere III) Estonian actor
 Frank Jr. Jr. (fictional character) from the NBC Friends-verse

See also

 
 The Third (disambiguation), including the junior of a Jr.

 JR (disambiguation)